Cape D'Aguilar is a cape on Hong Kong Island, Hong Kong. The cape is on the southeastern end of D'Aguilar Peninsula.  To its north are Shek O and D'Aguilar Peak.

Name 
It is named after Major-General George Charles d'Aguilar.

Geography
Cape D'Aguilar is in the Southern District. Nearby, there are two small islands collectively called Kau Pei Chau. A channel called Sheung Sze Mun is located close to the cape.

Marine Reserve

Cape D'Aguilar is environmentally protected as part of the Cape D'Aguilar Marine Reserve.

Cape D'Aguilar Lighthouse

Cape D'Aguilar Lighthouse is one of the declared monuments of Hong Kong. It is also known as Hok Tsui Beacon. The lighthouse is one of five pre-war surviving lighthouses in Hong Kong; it is also the oldest lighthouse in Hong Kong. Two of the five lighthouses are on Green Island while the other three are at Cape D'Aguilar, Waglan Island and Tang Lung Chau respectively. Waglan Lighthouse and Tang Lung Chau Lighthouse are also declared monuments of Hong Kong.

The lighthouse was named after Major-General Sir George Charles d'Aguilar and began service 6 April 1875. When the Waglan Island Lighthouse began operation in 1896 the Cape D'Aguilar light was rendered obsolete. In 1905 the light was removed and transferred to the Green Island Lighthouse to replace the forth order Fresnel light. In 1975 the Cape D'Aguilar was placed back into service with an automated system.

See also

 Green Island Lighthouse Compound
 Waglan Lighthouse
 Tang Lung Chau Lighthouse

References

External links

Satellite image of the peninsula by Google Maps
Cape D’Aguilar Lighthouse video on YouTube

Capes of Hong Kong
Declared monuments of Hong Kong
Southern District, Hong Kong